Soslan Valeryevich Takazov (born 28 February 1993) is a Russian football defender. He plays for FC Kuban Krasnodar.

Club career
He made his senior competitive debut for FC Alania Vladikavkaz on 25 August 2011 in the return leg of Europa League qualifier against Beşiktaş, when he had to substitute injured Aslan Dudiyev in the 20th minute. Alania won 2–0 but lost 2–3 on aggregate.

He made his debut in the Russian Football National League for Alania on 29 August 2011 in a game against FC Shinnik Yaroslavl.

He made his Russian Premier League debut for FC Amkar Perm on 4 August 2014 in a game against FC Terek Grozny. After regularly starting for Amkar in the first half of the 2014–15 Russian Premier League season, he was moved to the Under-21 squad after the winter break.

He spent the next 4 seasons in the FNL.

On 26 May 2019, he signed with FC Tambov which was just promoted to the Russian Premier League.

Career statistics

References

1993 births
People from Irafsky District
Sportspeople from North Ossetia–Alania
Living people
Russian footballers
Russia youth international footballers
Association football defenders
FC Dynamo Moscow reserves players
FC Spartak Vladikavkaz players
FC Amkar Perm players
FC Tyumen players
FC Volgar Astrakhan players
FC Luch Vladivostok players
FC Baltika Kaliningrad players
FC Armavir players
FC Tambov players
FC Urozhay Krasnodar players
Russian Premier League players
Russian First League players
Russian Second League players